Clivina shortlandica is a species of ground beetle in the subfamily Scaritinae. It was described by Emden in 1937.

References

shortlandica
Beetles described in 1937